2012 in Thai football involves the national competitions of the Thai football league system and the national team.

Domestic leagues

Thai Premier League

Division 1 League

Domestic cups

Thai FA Cup

League Cup

Kor Royal Cup

King's Cup

National team

Men's

Women's

References

 
Seasons in Thai football